The SOM is a next-generation autonomous, stealth, high precision cruise missile developed by TÜBİTAK SAGE, Defence Research and Development Institute of Turkey. It was first revealed during the 100th anniversary celebrations of the Turkish Air Force at the Çiğli Air Base in İzmir, on 4 June 2011. Developed since 2006, the SOM is Turkey's first domestic guided missile for striking both stationary and moving targets at a stand-off distance of over 180 kilometers. Although being developed by TÜBİTAK SAGE which still holds authority over the design of the missile, ROKETSAN has been given the role of manufacturing and marketing the missile for export.

Description
The SOM stand-off cruise missile is a family of launch and leave precision strike weapons against both land or sea targets. It uses GPS as its primary mode of guidance complemented by an advanced Inertial Navigation System and a radar-based Terrain Referenced Navigation system, allowing the missile to skim the terrain during its flight in order to evade local defence systems. According to the developer, it features advanced geometry and aerodynamics over similar missile systems, as well as lightweight composite components that minimize the radar cross-section of the missile. A terminal stage infrared imager detects the individual target by matching its signature with a pre-loaded database of similar targets allowing for precision strike. It can also be used to provide image-based midcourse navigation by taking snapshots of waypoints and comparing them against predicted position to update the navigation system. Thus, if GPS capability is denied or degraded, the missile can follow its waypoints using infrared based terrain updates. The missile includes a two-way datalink that makes possible to change the task in flight. The basic design of the missile includes a fuselage designed specifically to fit in the internal weapons bays of the Joint Strike Fighter. It is intended to achieve high accuracy in striking military targets like command and control facilities, SAM sites, parked aircraft and surface ships.

Development

Tests
According to the TUBITAK-SAGE officials, the initial demonstration flights of the prototypes were completed successfully. The missile made its first guided flight on 9 August 2011 over the Black Sea. Covering more than 100 nautical miles using GPS/INS guidance, the missile successfully hit its target with high accuracy. It was planned to assess the design aspects of the missile by conducting about 30 test flights. The delivery of a first batch of missiles to the Turkish Air Force would take place by the end of 2011, following more complicated live firing tests planned for the rest of the year.

In 2013 SOM successfully hit its target from a 800km distance.

Range
Shortly after, head of the Scientific and Technological Research Council of Turkey (TÜBİTAK) Yücel Altınbaşak informed that they set a task to develop the missile to  within 2 years. "The SOM missile is currently tested for  range and successfully achieved  precision goal, demonstrating around  accuracy in live fires. We are planning to start  range tests this year.

Production
On 26 October 2018, Turkey's defence industry authority announced that the missile entered serial production phase with Roketsan.

Variants
TUBITAK-SAGE developed the missile in several configurations, with different warheads and guidance/communication packages:
SOM-A: inertial/GPS guidance, high-explosive fragmentation warhead.
SOM-B1: inertial/GPS/imaging infrared guidance, high-explosive fragmentation warhead.
SOM-B2: inertial/GPS/imaging infrared guidance, tandem-charge warhead for use against hardened targets.
SOM-C1: inertial/GPS/imaging infrared guidance, high-explosive fragmentation warhead for use against mobile targets. Still in development.
SOM-C2: inertial/GPS/imaging infrared guidance, tandem-charge warhead for use against hardened mobile targets. Still in development.
SOM-J: inertial/GPS/imaging infrared guidance, semi armour-piercing warhead for use against ships. Still in development.

SOM-C1, C2 and J variants will feature a data-link for man-in-the-loop update of a waypoint and terminal stage of the missile.

Foreign Partnerships

F-35 Lightning II
On 24 October 2014 Roketsan and Lockheed Martin entered into a teaming agreement whereby the parties would modify, produce and market jointly a new variant of the SOM missile, dubbed SOM-J, for use in the internal carriages of the F-35. The SOM was one of two cruise missiles to be integrated with the F-35, the other being the Joint Strike Missile developed by Kongsberg Defence & Aerospace of Norway. 

As of 2019, the status of further integration has been put in doubt following Turkey's expulsion from the F-35 program as a result of its purchase of the Russian S-400 air-defense system.

Users 
 : The SOM missile has been integrated for use on TAI produced Turkish Air Force F-16 Fighting Falcon and Turkish Air Force operated F-4E 2020. Also planned to be used on the Bayraktar Akıncı UCAV. It is estimated that so far, a total of 495+ Stand-Off Missile (SOM) ALCMs have been ordered under two separate contracts (80+415)
 : Azerbaijan Air Force (AAF) has bought SOM missiles from the Turkish company of Roketsan.

See also
AGM-158 JASSM
C-802
Hatf-VIII (Ra'ad)
HOPE/HOSBO
Joint Strike Missile
KEPD 350
Saber
Storm Shadow
YJ-12
YJ-22

References

Anti-ship cruise missiles
Air-to-surface missiles of Turkey
Cruise missiles of Turkey
Post–Cold War weapons of Turkey
Roketsan products
Military equipment introduced in the 2010s